(April 6, 1898—July 17, 1963) was a Japanese entomologist. His research focused on hemiptera, including aphids, whiteflies, and scale insects. He published more than 420 articles.

Taxa named after him include:
 Takahashilecanium 
 Xenolecanium takahashii 
 Rhachisphora takahashii 
 Melanaphis takahashii 
 Aclerda takahashii 
 Dicranomyia takahashii 
 Rhyacobates takahashii 
 Ormosia takahashii 
 Aleurotuberculatus takahashii 
 Aleyrodes takahashii 
 Rhinopsylla takashii 
 Setaleytodes takahashia 
 Isotomurus takahashii 
 Asterobemisia takahashii 
 Dialeurolonga takahashi 
 Togepsylla takahashii

References

Further reading

 
 
 
 
 
 
 
 

1898 births
1963 deaths
Japanese entomologists
20th-century Japanese zoologists